Massachusetts Senate's Norfolk, Bristol and Plymouth district in the United States is one of 40 legislative districts of the Massachusetts Senate. It covers portions of Bristol, Norfolk, and Plymouth counties. Since 2017 it is represented in the State Senate by Walter F. Timilty, Jr. of the Democratic Party. Candidates for this district seat in the 2020 Massachusetts general election include Jarred Rose.

Locales represented
The district includes the following localities:
 Avon
 part of Braintree
 Canton
 part of East Bridgewater
 part of Easton
 Milton
 Randolph
 part of Sharon
 Stoughton
 West Bridgewater

Senators 
 John M. Quinlan, circa 1973 
 William R. Keating, circa 1995-1997 
 Jo Ann Sprague, 1999-2001 
 Brian A. Joyce, 2003-2015 
 Walter F. Timilty, Jr., 2017-current

See also
 List of Massachusetts Senate elections
 List of Massachusetts General Courts
 Bristol County districts of the Massachusetts House of Representatives: 1st, 2nd, 3rd, 4th, 5th, 6th, 7th, 8th, 9th, 10th, 11th, 12th, 13th, 14th
 Norfolk County districts of the Massachusetts House of Representatives: 1st, 2nd, 3rd, 4th, 5th, 6th, 7th, 8th, 9th, 10th, 11th, 12th, 13th, 14th, 15th
 Plymouth County districts of the Massachusetts House of Representatives: 1st, 2nd, 3rd, 4th, 5th, 6th, 7th, 8th, 9th, 10th, 11th, 12th
 List of former districts of the Massachusetts Senate

Images
Portraits of legislators

References

Further reading

External links
 Ballotpedia
  (State Senate district information based on U.S. Census Bureau's American Community Survey).

Senate
Government of Norfolk County, Massachusetts
Government of Bristol County, Massachusetts
Government of Plymouth County, Massachusetts
Massachusetts Senate